Cobra is a discontinued general-purpose, object-oriented programming language. Cobra is designed by Charles Esterbrook, and runs on the Microsoft .NET and Mono platforms. It is strongly influenced by Python, C#, Eiffel, Objective-C, and other programming languages. It supports both static and dynamic typing. It has support for unit tests and contracts. It has lambda expressions, closures, list comprehensions, and generators.

Cobra is an open-source project; it was released under the MIT License on February 29, 2008.

Features
Object-oriented
 Namespaces
 Classes, interfaces, structs, extensions, enumerations
 Methods, properties, indexers
 Mixins, extension methods
 Generics, attributes
Quality control
 Contracts, assertions
 Unit tests, docstrings
 Compile-time nil-tracking
Expressiveness
 Static and dynamic binding
 List, dictionary, and set literals
 in and implies operator
 for expressions
 Slicing
 Interpolated strings
 Compile-time type inference
 Lambdas and closures
General productivity
 Exception handling
 Postmortem exception report
 Garbage collection
Scripting conveniences
 Clean syntax
 Dynamic binding
 One-step run
 Shebang line (#!)
Miscellaneous
 Documentation tool (cobra -doc)
 Syntax highlighting tool (cobra -highlight)

Examples
The following examples can be run from a file using cobra <filename>.

Hello World

class Hello
    def main
        print 'HELLO WORLD'

A simple class

class Person

    var _name as String
    var _age as int

    cue init(name as String, age as int)
        _name, _age = name, age

    def toString as String is override
        return 'My name is [_name] and I am [_age] years old'

References

External links
 
 The Cobra blog by Charles Esterbrook
 Cobra News Index

.NET programming languages
Object-oriented programming languages
Programming languages created in 2006
Software using the MIT license